Nitro World Games 2018 was an action sports competition by Nitro Circus that took place between August 10 and December 1, 2018.

This Nitro World Games was the first held at multiple venues and the first with venues outside the United States. The games were broadcast live through social media platforms.

Results

Medal count

Vista

Erda

Corby

Paris

References

External links
Website

2018 in sports in Utah
2018 in multi-sport events
2018 in motorcycle sport